Miloslav Luňák (born 2 February 1902) was a Czech long-distance runner. He competed in the marathon at the 1936 Summer Olympics.

References

1902 births
Year of death missing
Athletes (track and field) at the 1936 Summer Olympics
Czech male long-distance runners
Czech male marathon runners
Olympic athletes of Czechoslovakia
Sportspeople from Most (city)